The 2016–17 New Orleans Privateers men's basketball team represented the University of New Orleans during the 2016–17 NCAA Division I men's basketball season. The Privateers were led by sixth-year head coach Mark Slessinger and played their home games at Lakefront Arena as members of the Southland Conference. They finished the season 20–12, 13–5 in Southland play to win the regular season Southland championship. They defeated Sam Houston State and Texas A&M–Corpus Christi to win the Southland Conference tournament. As a result, they earned the conference's automatic bid to the NCAA tournament where they lost in the First Four to Mount St. Mary's.

Previous season 
The Privateers finished the 2015–16 season 10–20, 6–12 to finish in a three-way tie for ninth place Southland play. They lost to Southeastern Louisiana in the first round of the Southland tournament.

Roster

Schedule and results

|-
!colspan=9 style=|Non-conference regular season

|-
!colspan=9 style=|Southland regular season

|-
!colspan=9 style=| Southland tournament

|-
!colspan=9 style=| NCAA tournament

See also
2016–17 New Orleans Privateers women's basketball team

References

New Orleans Privateers men's basketball seasons
New Orleans
New Orleans Privateers men's basketball
New Orleans Privateers men's basketball
New Orleans